Johannes Voigt (27 August 1786 – 23 September 1863) was a German historian born in Bettenhausen, which today is situated in the district of Schmalkalden-Meiningen.

He studied history, theology and philology at the University of Jena, where two of his instructors were Heinrich Luden (1778-1847) and Johann Jakob Griesbach (1745–1812). After graduation, he was an instructor in Halle before becoming a professor at the University of Königsberg in 1817. He died in Königsberg. His son Georg Voigt (1827–1891) was a famous historian.

Johannes Voigt is remembered for his large number of writings concerning the history of Prussia. However, his best-known work was a book about Pope Gregory VII titled Hildebrand als Papst Gregor VII und sein Zeitalter. It is considered an important work because it is an impartial writing by a Protestant who depicts Gregory as a reformer.

Written works 
 Hildebrand als Papst Gregor VII. und sein Zeitalter, Weimar 1815, second edition 1846 (Hildebrand as Pope Gregory VII and his Era). 
 Geschichte des Lombardenbunds, Königsberg. 1818. (History of the Lombard League). 
 Geschichte Preußens von den ältesten Zeiten bis zum Untergange der Herrschaft des Deutschen Ordens, Königsberg 1827-39, nine volumes (Prussian history from ancient times until the destruction of the rule of the Teutonic Knights).
 Codex diplomaticus prussicus, Königsberg 1836-61, six volumes.
 Die westfälischen Femgerichte in Bezug auf Preußen, Königsberg 1836. 
 Briefwechsel der berühmtesten Gelehrten des Zeitalters der Reformation mit Herzog Albrecht von Preußen, Königsberg 1841. 
 Handbuch der Geschichte Preußens bis zur Reformation, Königsberg 1842-43, three volumes (Handbook of the history of Prussia up to the Reformation). 
 Geschichte des sogen. Tugendbunds, Königsberg 1850.
 Markgraf Albrecht Alcibiades von Brandenburg-Kulmbach Berlin 1852, two volumes (Margrave Albrecht Alcibiades of Brandenburg-Kulmbach).
 Geschichte des Deutschen Ritterordens Berlin 1857-59, two volumes, (History of the Teutonic Knights). 
 Die Erwerbung der Neumark, Ziel und Erfolg der Brandenburgischen Politik unter den Kurfürsten Friedrich I. und Friedrich II 1402-1457, Berlin 1863. (The acquisition of the Neumark; Goal and success of the policy under Brandenburg Elector Frederick I and Frederick II, 1402-1457).

References 
 This article is based on a translation of the equivalent article at the German Wikipedia, source listed as: ADB:Voigt, Johannes at Allgemeine Deutsche Biographie.

1786 births
1863 deaths
19th-century German historians
German Protestants
People from Saxe-Meiningen
University of Jena alumni
Academic staff of the University of Halle
Academic staff of the University of Königsberg
Members of the Prussian House of Lords
German male non-fiction writers